Nyiko Floyd Shivambu (born 1 January 1983) is a South African politician serving as a member of parliament for the Economic Freedom Fighters. He was born in Malamulele, Limpopo. He is the Deputy President and lieutenant commander-in-chief of the Economic Freedom Fighters, its Parliamentary Chief Whip in the South African Parliament, who serves in the Trade and Industry Portfolio Committee and the Standing Committee on Finance. Shivambu is also a Member of the Pan African Parliament, serving in the Rural Economy, Agriculture, Natural Resources and Environment Committee.

Early life 
Shivambu was born in the rural village of Mahonisi, Malamulele town in the Limpopo province South Africa. He was one of seven children. He grew up in a house without running water nor electricity. His parents earned a living as informal traders selling hand made duvets and pillowcases in nearby towns.

Shivambu graduated from the Mphambo High School in Malamulele in 2001, and went on to study at the University of the Witwatersrand in Johannesburg initially intending to study to become a technician. He changed academic focus and instead earned a bachelor's degree as well as an honours Degree in Political Studies and International Relations. Shivambu went on to graduate with a master's degree, with distinction, in political studies in 2014. In his third year at the University of the Witwatersrand, Shivambu was elected president of the university's Student Representative Body and joined the African National Congress Youth League.

On 6 February 2018, he announced that he has been accepted by the Wits School of Governance to pursue a doctoral degree with his thesis focused on SA's transformation policies, legislation and practices: ownership and control of JSE-listed companies.

Political career 
Member of Parliament for the EFF (2014–present)
Member of the Pan-African Parliament (2014-2018)
Spokesperson of African National Congress Youth League (2008–2012)
Board Member of the National Student Financial Aid Scheme (2008–2012)
Students Representative of Joint Initiative for Priority Skills Acquisition (2006–2007)
Student Representative Council president at University of Witwatersrand (2004–2005)
National Executive of South African Students Congress

Shivambu is the Deputy President in the Economic Freedom Fighters (2013–present) and responsible for Policy, Research, and International Relations.

Since their days in the African National Congress Youth League, Shivambu and Julius Malema have appeared as close political allies. Following both their suspension from the African National Congress, Floyd Shivambu co-founded the Economic Freedom Fighters (EFF), alongside Julius Malema.

In 2014, he co-edited a book about Julius Malema, entitled The Coming Revolution: Julius Malema and the Fight for Economic Freedom.

Controversies
In 2011, Shivambu was ousted from his position as ANC Youth League spokesman by an ANC disciplinary hearing, after he swore at a journalist, and after making comments about helping to bring about regime change in Botswana.

On 17 August 2018, Shivambu was arrested for speeding. He was caught driving at 182 km/h in 120 km/h zone, and subsequently released on bail.

Assault of journalist 
On 20 March 2018, Shivambu was filmed attacking a journalist outside Parliament and was scheduled to stand trial for assault in February 2021. This hearing was subsequently postponed until September 2021.

Paternity scandal 
In 2015, Shivambu was involved in a heavily publicised paternity scandal. After initially denying that he had fathered a child with his former girlfriend, Andile Masuku, he later acknowledged the child was his son following a paternity test. In November 2015, he claimed he could not afford the R5000 monthly maintenance.

Racial prejudice 
Shivambu was criticised for demanding to know why treasury official Ismail Momoniat, who is of South African Indian ancestry, was presenting so often to parliament instead of a black National Treasury official, stating that Momoniat's presence "undermines African leadership". This led to widespread condemnation of Shivambu by other politicians and on social media for both questing Momoniat's role in the anti-apartheid movement and for being racially prejudiced.

Four months later, the Daily Maverick stated that a likely reason for Shivambu's statements about Momoniat was because he was part of a group of treasury officials investigating the collapse of VBS Mutual Bank which allegedly involved Shivambu and his brother Brian Shivambu.

VBS Bank 
A report published by the South African Reserve Bank in October 2018 indicated that Shivambu's brother, Brian Shivambu, was the recipient of R16,148,569 (US$1.09 million) in irregular payments from the now collapsed bank VBS Mutual Bank. Further investigative reporting by Pauli Van Wyk with considerable substantiating evidence alleged that R1.3 million of this money was then paid to the EFF and R10 million given to Floyd Shivambu himself. Shivambu has since asked that anyone who has evidence he had dealings with VBS must come forward.

During this period the Mail & Guardian newspaper published an article based on WhatsApp texts leaked by a whistleblower alleging that Shivambu's brother's company was a conduit for Shivambu to receive illicit payments.

Ongoing forensic financial investigations indicate that at least R1.84-million illicitly flowed from VBS Mutual Bank, via two front companies, into Shivambu’s personal bank account.

References

1982 births
Economic Freedom Fighters politicians
Living people
People from Limpopo
South African politicians
Members of the National Assembly of South Africa